Vera Freeman (1865 - 1896) was a stage actress who was found dead at the Pomeroy Hotel in Manhattan, at Broadway and 59th Street, on the morning of January 25, 1896. Her death was attributed to morphine, which she took for insomnia.

Husband - Max Freeman

Vera's husband, Max Freeman, a theatrical promoter for "The Fencing Master" company, was in Philadelphia, Pennsylvania at the time of her death. The two had been separated for three years. after Max was sued by Vera for infidelity with actress Maud Kenyon, in March 1893. In April 1896 Max Freeman managed the performances of Lillian Russell at the Columbia Theatre in Brooklyn, New York.

References

Vera Freeman
Vera Freeman
Vera Freeman
Vera Freeman